The European Society of Paediatric and Neonatal Intensive Care (ESPNIC) is a Europe-wide medical association that works to promote paediatric and neonatal intensive care standards among health care professionals, notably doctors and nurses in the field.

Mission 

ESPNIC is dedicated to promoting “the delivery of the highest quality of care to the critically ill children throughout Europe.”

History 

ESPNIC was founded during the 1980 International Congress on Paediatrics in Barcelona, Spain by a group of physicians attending the congress. They decide to meet annually to discuss paediatric intensive care. The group adopted the name “The Society of Paediatric Intensive Care (ESPIC).” In 1987, the ESPIC Nurse Working Group was founded, which was made into a separate branch of the society in 1994. In 1998 the name of the society was changed to ESPNIC out of the realization of the importance of neonatal intensive care nurses and physicians in the organization. As of 2015, ESPNIC had over 400 members in and outside of Europe.

Activities 

One of ESPNIC's flagship activity is its European Paediatric/Neonatal Intensive Care Diploma (EPIC Diploma). The purpose of the EPIC Diploma program is to harmonize and improve quality standards for safe, independent practice in paediatric and neonatal intensive care in Europe and elsewhere. The EPIC Diploma program is intended to be complementary to national standards and enhance the competent, ethical, and professional care of critically ill children. The ESPNIC Academy is ESPNIC's one stop educational e-learning portal. It is the 'go-to' learning tool in the field of paediatric and neonatal intensive care featuring a wide range of educational content developed by ESPNIC over the years.

ESPNIC also maintains a registry of pediatric intensive care units (PICUs) and neonatal intensive care units (NICUs) throughout Europe on their website. The registry lists important PICUs and NICUs in seventeen European countries as well as in Canada, Israel, South Africa, and Turkey.

See also 

 Neonatology
 Neonatal intensive-care unit
 Preterm birth
 Pediatric intensive-care unit
 Intensive care unit

References

External links 

 The Journal Intensive Care Medicine

International medical associations of Europe
Pediatric organizations
Organizations established in 1980
Intensive care organizations